Lakin Correctional Center (LCC) is a women's prison in the community of Lakin in unincorporated Mason County, West Virginia.

A part of the West Virginia Division of Corrections and Rehabilitation, it is the sole prison in that system that has only female prisoners. It has a capacity of 543 prisoners.

History
The prison's construction began in 1999, with some former Lakin Hospital buildings demolished to make way for the prison. Until the prison opened on January 29, 2003, there was no single women's prison in West Virginia and women were scattered across various facilities. A factory building and two minimum security housing facilities were built in 2005 and 2006.

In a period prior to 2015 the WVDOC considered converting Lakin into a men's prison and moving women to another prison in Sugar Grove. These plans were canceled since residents of Mason County and elected officials of that county and at the state level opposed this plan. On September 4, 2015, Governor of West Virginia Earl Ray Tomblin stated that a section of the property of the nearby armory could be used as a satellite for Lakin; area residents opposed this move.

Facilities
The two minimum security facilities have a combined capacity of 160 prisoners.

Programs
The West Virginia Department of Education operates vocational and educational programs.

Notable inmates
 Shelia Eddy and Rachel Shoaf, convicted murderers of Skylar Neese
 Ramsey Carpenter-Bearse, former Miss. Kentucky

See also
 Incarceration of women in the United States

References

External links
 Lakin Correctional Center and Jail - West Virginia Division of Corrections and Rehabilitation
 Lakin Correctional Center Inmate Handbook (2014) - posted at the University of Michigan School of Law - Info page

Women's prisons in the United States
Prisons in West Virginia
Buildings and structures in Mason County, West Virginia
2003 establishments in West Virginia